Riverview may refer to one of these locales in the U.S. state of Oregon:

Riverview, Lane County, Oregon
Riverview, Multnomah County, Oregon
Riverview, Umatilla County, Oregon
Riverview, an alternate name for Adrian, Oregon

References